Bodine was a Dutch heavy metal band which was active from 1978 until 1984.

The band released three albums: Bodine (1981), Bold as Brass (1982) and Three Times Running (1983). Bodine debuted with Jay van Feggelen as the vocalist, who performed as the Barbarian in the album Into the Electric Castle by Ayreon. The creator of Ayreon, Arjen Anthony Lucassen, tried becoming the lead singer of Bodine, but was added as a guitarist instead. The band is currently inactive. In 2012, Jay van Feggelen joined The Southside Blues Revue as lead singer under the alias of Jay Bodean, a clear reference to his Bodine past.

Discography 
 Bodine (1981)
 Bold as Brass (1982)
 Three Times Running (1983)

References

External links 

Dutch heavy metal musical groups
Musical groups established in 1978
Musical groups disestablished in 1984
Arjen Anthony Lucassen
Musical quintets
1978 establishments in the Netherlands